East Sheen Filling Station is a petrol service station at 567 Upper Richmond Road, East Sheen, London SW14 in the London Borough of Richmond upon Thames. It dates from about 1926. In 2012 Historic England designated it as a Grade II listed building, citing it as "one of the earliest surviving examples of a purpose-built filling station" and "a pioneering UK instance of an 'American-style' filling station, with canopy and office under a single roof".

References

1920s establishments in England
East Sheen
Grade II listed buildings in the London Borough of Richmond upon Thames
Historic filling stations in the United Kingdom
Texaco